Bhalowali is a village in Batala in Gurdaspur district of Punjab State, India. The village is administrated by Sarpanch an elected representative of the village. It was a jagir ruled by Sidhu Jats.

See also
List of villages in India

References 

Villages in Gurdaspur district